Weitsman is a surname, a variant of Weizmann. Notable people with the surname include:

Adam Weitsman, American entrepreneur and philanthropist
Mel Weitsman (born 1929), American Zen Buddhist
Patricia A. Weitsman (1964–2014), American political scientist

See also
Weissmann